Omaopio is a farming area on the slopes of the volcano Haleakala (or Hale Akala) on the island of Maui.  The western side of Haleakala is commonly known as Kula. In Kula ridges of land run up the slopes of the volcano. Omaopio refers to a ridge of land that contains the road named Omaopio Road. It is north of another ridge of land commonly known as Pulehu.

Omaopio is reached by taking Pulehu Road east. Omaopio Road forks to the left, away from Pulehu Road about five miles east of Hansen Road and continues up the slope of the volcano. About two miles past the fork with Pulehu Road begins the area of Omaopio. Omaopio can also be reached by taking the Haleakala Highway east past the town of Pukalani and continuing on the Kula Highway until the intersection of Kula Highway and Omaopio Road, and then turning right or left. Waipuna Chapel lies on the southeast side of the intersection.  Omaopio Road ends about two hundred yards above Kula Highway where it connects to Lower Kula Road.

Omaopio was originally settled by several Japanese families.  It has been and still is a farming community with very rich soil. Traditional crops include the Kula onion (Granex), broccoli,  beans, and cabbage.  Recently, coffee (arabica) has been introduced. Traditional animals include goats, hogs and cattle.  More recently the area has seen a large influx of horses, and commercial stables. Sugar cane fields bracketed the lower end of the road, but crop plantings were discontinued in 2016.

At the lower end of Omaopio Road is Surfing Goat Dairy which produces more than 30 different goat's milk cheese. Sixteen of the cheeses have won a National Award since 2004. Surfing Goat Dairy offers tours of the dairy farm nearly daily.

References

Maui